Just for Tonight is a surviving 1918 American silent comedy-drama film directed by Charles Giblyn and starring Tom Moore. It was produced and distributed by Goldwyn Pictures, one of the predecessors of MGM.

Cast
Tom Moore as Theodore Whitney Jr.
Lucy Fox as Betty Blake
Henry Sedley as Crandall
Henry Hallam as Major Blackburn
Robert Broderick as Theodore 'Ted' Whitney Sr.
Ethel Grey Terry as Lady Roxenham
Eddie Sturgis as Detective Chase (credited as Edwin Sturgis)
Phil Ryley as The Butler
Maude Turner Gordon as Mrs. Blackburn

Preservation status
Just for Tonight survives and a copy of the film is held at Insituto Valenciano De Cinematografia, Valencia in Spain.

References

External links

Lobby poster

1918 films
American silent feature films
Films directed by Charles Giblyn
Goldwyn Pictures films
American black-and-white films
1910s English-language films
1918 comedy-drama films
1910s American films
Silent American comedy-drama films